José Ignacio Álvarez Thomas (15 February 1787 – 20 July 1857) was a South American military commander and politician of the early 19th century.

Biography 
Álvarez Thomas was born in Arequipa, Peru, and his family lived for some time in Lima. When his father, who was in Spanish service, was called back to Madrid in 1797, they travelled via Buenos Aires. The family stayed there while his father continued the voyage alone, and Álvarez joined the army in 1799. Subsequently, he got heavily involved in the independence war in Argentina.

In the war against the British in 1806/07, he was wounded and captured, and released only after the withdrawal of the British troops. Under Carlos María de Alvear, he fought as a colonel at Montevideo, where he was awarded a medal. However, soon after he openly opposed the politics of de Alvear's government, and his insurrection caused the resignation of the latter and resulted in a new election of a Supreme Director in the Constituting General Assembly, where he was designated interim Supreme Director from 20 April 1815, to 16 April 1816, in place of the elected José Rondeau, who was absent on a military campaign in Peru. Álvarez was sworn in on 6 May but had to resign a year later after some military failures. When the Constituting General Assembly was dissolved in 1820, he was, as a still-influential member of the former leadership, sent to prison, but released after 19 days. Subsequently, his political influence was greatly diminished.

In 1825, he was named ambassador in Peru, and in October also named ambassador to Chile. After his return to Buenos Aires, he was exiled and also spent some time in prison for his opposition against the government of Juan Manuel de Rosas. He emigrated to Rio de Janeiro, from where he tried to mount an insurrection against Rosas in 1840. In 1846, he fled first the Chile and then Peru, before returning to Buenos Aires after the fall of Rosas government in 1852.

He died likely of tuberculosis on 20 July 1857, in Buenos Aires in Argentina at the age of 70.

References

External links 

1787 births
1857 deaths
People from Arequipa
Peruvian emigrants to Argentina
Argentine diplomats
Argentine Army officers
Ambassadors of Argentina to Chile
Ambassadors of Argentina to Peru
Supreme Directors of the United Provinces of the Río de la Plata
People of the Argentine War of Independence
Argentine prisoners of war
Burials at La Recoleta Cemetery
Peruvian people of Spanish descent
Peruvian people of French descent
19th-century diplomats
19th-century deaths from tuberculosis
Tuberculosis deaths in Argentina
Patrician families of Buenos Aires